Potamites montanicola is a species of lizard in the family Gymnophthalmidae. It is endemic to Peru.

References

Potamites
Reptiles of Peru
Endemic fauna of Peru
Reptiles described in 2012
Taxa named by German Chavez
Taxa named by Diego Vasquez (herpetologist)